Methanocaldococcus jannaschii (formerly Methanococcus jannaschii) is a thermophilic methanogenic archaean in the class Methanococci. It was the first archaeon to have its complete genome sequenced. The sequencing identified many genes unique to the archaea. Many of the synthesis pathways for methanogenic cofactors were worked out biochemically in this organism, as were several other archaeal-specific metabolic pathways.

History 

Methanocaldococcus jannaschii was isolated from a submarine hydrothermal vent at Woods Hole Oceanographic Institution.

Sequencing 

Methanocaldococcus jannaschii was sequenced by a group at TIGR led by Craig Venter using whole-genome shotgun sequencing. Methanocaldococcus jannaschii represented the first member of the Archaea to have its genome sequenced. According to Venter, the unique features of the genome provided strong evidence that there are three domains of life.

Taxonomy 

Methanocaldoccus jannaschii is a member of the genus Methanocaldococcus (previously a part of Methanococcus) and is therefore sometimes referred to as a "class I" methanogen (e.g. ).

Biology and biochemistry 

Methanocaldococcus jannaschii is a thermophilic methanogen, meaning it grows by making methane as a metabolic byproduct. It is only capable of growth on carbon dioxide and hydrogen as primary energy sources, unlike many other methanococci (such as Methanococcus maripaludis) which can also use formate as a primary energy source. The genome includes many hydrogenases, such as a 5,10-methenyltetrahydromethanopterin hydrogenase, a ferredoxin hydrogenase (eha), and a coenzyme F420 hydrogenase.

Proteomic studies showed that M. jannaschii contains a large number of inteins: 19 were discovered by one study.

Many novel metabolic pathways have been worked out in M. jannaschii, including the pathways for synthesis of many methanogenic cofactors, riboflavin, and novel amino acid synthesis pathways. Many information processing pathways have also been studied in this organism, such as an archaeal-specific DNA polymerase family. Information about single-pass transmembrane proteins from M. jannaschii was compiled in Membranome database.

References

Further reading 

 Jeffrey M. Dick, Everett L. Shock: The Release of Energy During Protein Synthesis at Ultramafic-Hosted Submarine Hydrothermal Ecosystems. In: AGU Journal of Geophysical Research: Biogeosciences, Volume 126, Issue 11, e2021JG006436. doi:10.1029/2021JG006436. First published: 30 October 2021. See also: New Possibilities for Life in the Strange, Dark World at the Bottom of Earth’s Ocean – And Perhaps in Oceans on Other Planets on SciTechDaily. November 28, 2021. Source: Arizona State University

External links 
 Microbe wiki entry for Methano(caldo)coccus jannaschii
 UCSD genome browser entry for Methanocaldococcus jannaschii
 KEGG entry for Methanocaldococcus jannaschii
Type strain of Methanocaldococcus jannaschii at BacDive -  the Bacterial Diversity Metadatabase

Euryarchaeota
Archaea described in 1983